Jalalvand Rural District is a rural district (dehestan) in Firuzabad District, Kermanshah County, Kermanshah Province, Iran. At the 2006 census, its population was 6,448, in 1,349 families. The rural district has 55 villages.

References 

Rural Districts of Kermanshah Province
Kermanshah County